Anna Guo is a Chinese-born Canadian traditional musician who plays the yangqin. She taught at the Shanghai Conservatory of Music. From 1985 to 1996, she was head of the Shanghai Women's Silk String Quintet. In 1996 she emigrated to Toronto, Ontario, Canada. In 2007, to celebrate the 10th anniversary of the return of Hong Kong, the Hong Kong Chinese Orchestra performed with Guo on yangqin, Wong Onyuen on gaohu, and George Gao on erhu.

Discography
1992 - Collection of Yang-qin Solos
1995 - Masterpieces Performed by Yang-qin Masters
2001 - Chinese Traditional Yang-qin Music Oliver Sudden Productions

References

External links
Anna Guo at Calabash Music
Anna Guo at National Geographic
[ Anna Guo] at AllMusic

Year of birth missing (living people)
Living people
Canadian classical musicians
Chinese emigrants to Canada
Musicians from Shanghai
Musicians from Toronto
Naturalized citizens of Canada